Clarissa Kyoko Mei Ling Chun (陳美玲)  is the Head Coach of the Iowa Hawkeyes Women's wrestling program, formerly, the USA Wrestling assistant National coach and an American Olympic women's freestyle 48 kg (105.5 lbs) wrestler.  Chun is the first female wrestler from Hawaii to win a medal at the Olympics. Olympic medalist Clarissa Chun was inducted into the 2018 Hawaii Sports Hall of Fame and 2022 National Wrestling Hall of Fame as a Distinguished Member. 

Clarissa Chun ’05, Olympic medalist, four-time U.S. Open champion and University of Colorado Colorado Springs alumna, has been named to the National Wrestling Hall of Fame’s Class of 2022.  It is the first time that more than one female Distinguished Member has been selected, and Chun and McMann become the third and fourth female Distinguished Members, joining Tricia Saunders (2006) and Kristie Davis (2018).

Clarissa Chun, a World champion and Olympic medalist for Team USA, past USA Wrestling Assistant Women’s National Coach, and current head coach of women’s wrestling at the University of Iowa, was among the inductees of the 2023 class of the National Federation of State High School Associations (NFHS) National High School Hall of Fame.

On November 18, 2021, Chun was announced as the  first head coach of the University of Iowa’s women's wrestling program.

Biography
Chun was born in Honolulu, Hawaii and raised in Kapolei, Hawaii. She is Asian-American.
Her mother, Gail Higashi, is Japanese-American from Līhuʻe, Kauaʻi.
Her father, Bryan Chun, is Chinese-American from ʻAiea, Oʻahu.

In 2008, Chun taught English to kindergarten students in Japan.

On November 19, 2021, Chun was announced as the first ever Head Coach of the Iowa Hawkeyes Women's Wrestling Program. The program marks the first ever from a NCAA Power 5 Conference and will begin competition in the fall of 2023.

Athletic career
Chun came from a judo background, winning five junior national championships before she tried wrestling in her junior year at Roosevelt High School in Honolulu, Hawaii.
She captured the state wrestling title in 1998, the first year girls wrestling was a sanctioned sport.

Chun attended Missouri Valley College in Marshall, Missouri and earned a communications degree from the University of Colorado at Colorado Springs.

Chun was one of the charter members of the Valley program when it began in 1999, and was one of its most decorated. She placed second in the U.S. World Team Trials and medaled in both the U.S. Nationals and Pan American Games during all three of her seasons in Marshall—along with winning several college-level competitions.

Prior to her senior campaign, Chun accepted an invitation to attend the U.S. Olympic Training Center in Colorado Springs, eventually earning her degree from the University of Colorado branch there. After placing second in the U.S. Olympic Trials in 2004, the first year women's wrestling competition was held at the Games, she made the squad four years later.

At the 2008 U.S. Olympic wrestling team trials in June, Chun gained the admiration of fans and media alike by staging a huge upset of seven-time national champion and 2004 Olympic bronze medalist Patricia Miranda. In the process, Chun, who stands , fulfilled a lifelong dream, becoming the first wrestler from Hawai'i to qualify for a U.S. Olympic team.

Wrestling at the 2008 Summer Olympics – Women's freestyle 48 kg, after winning the first two matches, Chun fell to world champion Chiharu Icho of Japan in the semifinals in an overtime tiebreaker (last to score). She lost in the bronze-medal match to 2004 gold medalist Irini Merleni of Ukraine, and made her mark at the international level by finishing fifth.

Two months after the 2008 Olympic Games, Chun turned in a superb effort to capture a gold medal at the World 2008 Championships in Tokyo, Japan. She relied on her defense in pulling out a gritty 1–0, 1–0 finals win over Kazakhstan's Jyldyz Eshimova-Turtbayeva at the Yoyogi National Stadium.

Chun's successful seasons included winning the U.S. Senior National titles, and international titles from the Canada Cup, New York AC Freestyle International, Poland Open, Mongolia Championships, Russia International and Pan American Games. Chun also represented the U.S. at the FILA Women's World Cup in China in 2009 and Japan in 2012.

Chun became the first women's freestyle wrestler to be nominated to her second Olympic Team after her stellar performance at the 2012 U.S. Olympic Team Trials for Wrestling in Iowa City, Iowa, on April 22, 2012.

Wrestling at the 2012 Summer Olympics – Women's freestyle 48 kg, Chun qualified for the bronze-medal match by launching World bronze medalist Iwona Matkowska of Poland to her back and recording a dramatic second-period fall in the repechage.
Chun knocked off 2004 Olympic gold medalist Iryna Merleni of Ukraine 1–0, 3–0 to capture a bronze medal in women's freestyle wrestling at the 2012 London Olympics. Chun twice wrestled in the bronze medal match at the Olympics, winning her medal in London and taking fifth in Beijing. She was a five-time world team member, winning the world title in 2008.

Chun is currently an assistant coach for USA Wrestling's women's national team. On May 15, 2018, she was inducted into the Hawaii Sports Hall of Fame.

USA Wrestling National Women's Freestyle Assistant Coach Clarissa Chun has been invited as a United World Wrestling Ambassador to be a part of a program, reaching out to Syrian Refugees in Azraq, Jordan, on July 19.

The initiative, called Inspire Together for Peace, is a joint effort with UWW and World Taekwondo/Taekwondo Humanitarian Foundation. WT/THF already has an existing presence there with a facility and program to help get other sports established.

The goal of this initiative is to introduce these combat sports to the community.

On November 18, 2021, Chun was chosen as the inaugural coach for the women's wrestling program at the University of Iowa, the first women's wrestling program among Power 5 schools. As of 4/19/22, Iowa and Chun have attracted an array of the top recruits in the country to commit to the Hawkeyes; including four  #1 prospects in their respective weight divisions.

Team USA had three gold, two silver and four bronze at the Tokyo 2021 Olympics. It is the most medals won by the US in a non-boycotted Olympics, and is only surpassed by the 1984 Los Angeles team which won 13 medals. The USA had all five of its men's freestyle entries win a medal, as well as a record four women's freestyle medalists.

International award winning wrestler 
 2016: U.S. Olympic Team Trials champion – Third place – women's freestyle wrestling
 2016: Gold Medal – Pan Am Games women's freestyle, FRISCO, Texas.
 2016: 2nd place – Dave Schultz Memorial International tournament, Colorado Springs, CO 
 2015: Gold Medal – Open Cup of Russia, CHEBOKSARY, Russia
 2015: 3rd place – Henri Deglane Challenge, Nice, France
 2015: 3rd place – U.S. World Team Trials in Madison, Wisconsin
 2015: 3rd place – 2015 Las Vegas/ASICS U.S. Senior Open. May 8–9 at Las Vegas, NV.
 2015: 2nd place – Dave Schultz Memorial International tournament, Colorado Springs, CO 
 2014: 3rd place – U.S. World Team Trials in Madison, Wisconsin
 2014: 3rd place – in U.S. Nationals Open
 2014: Bronze Medal – Grand Prix of Paris, France.
 2012: 9th Place – Women's Freestyle World Championships, SHERWOOD PARK, Canada
 2012: Bronze medal – The Games of the XXX Olympiad (London, England, GB, UK)
 2012: 5th Place – Canada Cup, Guelph, Canada
 2012: Women's World Cup in Tokyo, Japan
 2012: U.S. Olympic Team Trials champion – First place – women's freestyle wrestling
 2012: Gold Medal – FILA Pan American Qualifier women's freestyle, KISSIMMEE, Florida.
 2011: 5th Place: Mongolia Open, ULAN BAATAR, Mongolia.
 2011: Gold Medal: U.S. Open Wrestling Championships in Arlington, Texas.
 2011: 2nd Place: New York AC Freestyle International.
 2011: Silver Medal – Pan Am Games women's freestyle, GUADALAJARA, Mexico
 2011: 7th Place – Women's Freestyle World Championships, ISTANBUL, Turkey
 2011: 1st place – Gold Medal – Poland Open, Poznan, Poland
 2011: 1st place – U.S. World Team Trials in Oklahoma City
 2011: Bronze: Mongolian National Wrestling Championship
 2011: Gold Medal: ASICS U.S. Open Wrestling Championships in Cleveland, Ohio.
 2011: Silver Medal: Grand Prix of Tourcoing, Tourcoing, France.
 2010: Gold Medal: Open Cup in Russia International.
 2010: 1st Place: New York AC Freestyle International.
 2010: Bronze Medal: German Grand Prix.
 2010: 2nd place – in U.S. World Team Trials
 2010: Gold Medal: Pan American Wrestling Championships in MONTERREY, Mexico.
 2009:Women's World Cup in Taiyuan, China
 2009: Gold Medal: Canada Cup, Guelph, Canada
 2009: Women's Freestyle World Championships – Herning, Denmark
 2009: 1st place – in U.S. World Team Trials
 2009: Gold Medal: Pan American Wrestling Championships in Maracaibo, Venezuela.
 2009: 1st place – in U.S. Nationals 
 2008: Women's Freestyle World Championships – First place – Gold Medal – 48 kg
 2008: 1st place – in U.S. World Team Trials
 2008: 5th place – Olympics – Beijing, China
 2008: U.S. Olympic Team Trials champion – First place – women's freestyle wrestling
105.5-pound division at the U.S. Olympic Team Trials for Wrestling and Judo – Beijing, China.
 2008: Fourth in U.S. Nationals
 2008: Gold Medal: Pan American Wrestling Championships in Colorado Springs, Colo.
 2008: Silver Medal: Guelph Open, Guelph, Canada
 2007: Fourth in U.S. World Team Trials
 2007: Third in U.S. Nationals
 2007: Third in Guelph Open (Canada)
 2006: U.S. Senior Nationals – Gold Medal
 2006: Second in New York AC Holiday International Open
 2006: Sunkist Kids/ASU International Open champion
 2006: U.S. Nationals champion
 2006: Vehbi Emre Golden Grand Prix champion (Turkey)
 2006: Tenth in Ivan Yarygin Memorial International (Russia)
 2006: Second in Klippan Ladies Golden Grand Prix (Sweden)
 2005: Sunkist Kids/ASU International champion – 1st Place 2005 Sunkist Kids / ASU International Open
 2005: Second in NYAC Holiday Championships
 2005: Clansmen International champion (Canada)
 2005: Third in U.S. World Team Trials
 2004: Second in Sunkist Kids International Open
 2004: Fourth in World Cup
 2004: Second at the U.S. Olympic Trials in women's wrestling (the first year with the style in the Olympics) (48 kg)
 2004: Second in U.S. Nationals
 2004: Sixth in Ivan Yarygin Memorial International (Russia)
 2004: Fourth in Dave Schultz Memorial International

USA Wrestling's Women's University National Champion

Consistently ranked No. 2 by USA Wrestling
 2003: Second in Sunkist Kids International Open
 2003: Second in U.S. World Team Trials
 2003: Second in U.S. Nationals
 2003: Fourth in Klippan Ladies Open (Sweden)
 April 14, 2003: USA Wrestling's Women's University National Champion in St. Joseph, Minn.
 2002: Second in U.S. World Team Trials – Runner-up
 2002: Fourth in U.S. Nationals
 2002: Third in Pan American Championships
 2002: was among the charter group of about 20 women invited to the U.S. Olympic Training Center when its women's wrestling facility opened.
 2001: Sunkist Kids International Open champion
 2001: Fourth in World Cup
 2001: Second in U.S. World Team Trials – Runner-up
 2001: Third in U.S. Nationals
 2001: Klippan Ladies Open champion (Sweden)
 2001: Second in Pan American Championships
 2001: Missouri Valley International Open champion
 2001: Second in Minnesota – Morris Women's Open
 2001: Third in Manitoba Open (Canada)
 2001: Represented USA in first Women's World Cup 2001 in Levalois, France
 2001: Won international open in Phoenix
 2001: USA Wrestling's Women's University National Champion
 2001: Fifth in Junior World Championships
 2000: DNP in World Championships
 2000: Second in Pan American Championships
 2000: Second in U.S. World Team Trials
 2000: Second in U.S. Nationals
 2000: Dave Schultz Memorial International champion
 2000: Minnesota-Morris Women's Open champion
 2000–02: Silver medal at Pan American Championships
 2000–01: FILA Junior Nationals champion
 2000: Third in University Nationals
 2000: U.S. World Team member
 2000: U.S. Collegiate Nationals champion
 2000: Eighth in Junior World Championships
 1999: Third in Sunkist Kids International Open
 1999: Third in Sunkist Kids International Open
 1999: USA Age-Group: Fourth in 2004 University World Championships
 1999: Hawaii State champion wrestler

Wrestling USA Magazine's High School Girls All-America Team
 1999 USGWA High School Nationals – Third
 1998: Hawaii State champion wrestler – the first year girls wrestling was a sanctioned sport.

CAREER NOTES: (themat.com)

References

External links 
 Official Facebook site (Hawaii)
 Clarissa Chun's Twitter Website
 Clarissa Chun's Website
 Honolulu Advertiser's Article
 NBC Olympics Biography 
 themat.com Biography
 Olelo News & Views 11/12: Ep – 29 Special Olympic Medalist Clarissa Chun
 PBS Hawaii Video 9/24/13 PBS Hawaii – Long Story Short with Leslie Wilcox: Clarissa Chun
 PBS Hawaii Video 8/29/12 Leahey & Leahey: 2012 Olympic Bronze Medalist Wrestler Clarissa Chun
 Olympic Bronze Medalist Clarissa Chun 8/20/12 Part 1
 Olympic Bronze Medalist Clarissa Chun Part 2 8/20/12 Part 2
 KHNL Sunrise Video 8/17/12
 KGMB Video 6/4/12
 KITV Video 6/12
Clarissa Chun Wrestling Olympic Medalist —2018 HSHOF Induction Acceptance Speech 6/25/21

1981 births
American sportswomen of Chinese descent
American female sport wrestlers
American sportspeople of Japanese descent
Living people
Medalists at the 2012 Summer Olympics
Missouri Valley College alumni
Olympic bronze medalists for the United States in wrestling
Sportspeople from Honolulu
University of Colorado alumni
Wrestlers at the 2008 Summer Olympics
Wrestlers at the 2011 Pan American Games
Wrestlers at the 2012 Summer Olympics
World Wrestling Championships medalists
Pan American Games silver medalists for the United States
President Theodore Roosevelt High School alumni
Pan American Games medalists in wrestling
Medalists at the 2011 Pan American Games
Hawaii people of Japanese descent
21st-century American women